"I'm Gonna Getcha Good!" is a song by Canadian singer Shania Twain. It was the first single from her fourth studio album, Up! (2002), and was co-written by Twain and her then-husband, Robert John "Mutt" Lange.

Background
"I'm Gonna Getcha Good!" was originally released to country radio in the United States on October 7, 2002. Twain chose "I'm Gonna Getcha Good!" as the first single for Up! since she thought it was relatable to her previous singles, and she did not want something too unfamiliar. The song has become one of her biggest hits worldwide, charting in different countries where she had never had hits before. There are three main versions of the song - the "Green" version and the "Red" version, which represented the country and pop mixes of the song respectively, and the "Blue" version, which featured additional production by producers Simon & Diamond Duggal in the style of Indian film music.

Later, the Jonas Brothers covered the song for the soundtrack for their film Jonas Brothers: The 3D Concert Experience.

Promotion
Since "I'm Gonna Getcha Good!" was the lead single from a brand-new album and Twain had been out of the public eye for a while, she performed the song all over the world to promote the album (as well as the single) and get herself back into the public eye. Sexually suggestive images were used to brand the single and promotion started in Europe, where in Germany she performed on Wetten, dass..?, in the UK she performed at BBC, Royal Variety Show, CD:UK, and Top of the Pops. In Sweden she performed the single on Bingolotto and in Portugal she performed on the Herman SIC Show. In Italy she performed at the Festival della canzone italiana. Following promotion in Europe she headed to Japan where she performed at the Japan Music Festival. In November 2002, she headed to North America, where she performed the song for the first time at the 2002 Country Music Awards on November 6. In New York the song was performed on The Late Show on the album release day (November 19) and The Today Show. In Canada, Twain headlined the Grey Cup half time show from Edmonton, and performed "I'm Gonna Getcha Good!" and "Up!" on November 24. In 2003 the song was also performed on the American Music Awards in a medley with "Up!", the Early Show and Vh1 Big in '03.

Critical reception
Reception to "I'm Gonna Getcha Good!" was mostly positive, though many reviews compared the song to earlier singles. Billboard called the single "one catchy little puppy," though stated the song is "more a reminder of where we've been than where she's planning to take us". About.com called the song "pure ear candy from beginning to end". Entertainment Weekly gave the song a C+ grade and found Shania "softening every edge with skillful vixen-next-door charm".

At the 2003 Juno Awards, "I'm Gonna Getcha Good!" was named Country Recording of the Year.

Music video
The music video for "I'm Gonna Getcha Good!" was shot in London, UK and directed by Paul Boyd. The music video was created by visualist Ash Beck. It was filmed on August 22 and 23, 2002, and debuted on MTV on October 4, 2002. The video is set in a dystopian futuristic setting, with Twain riding a motorcycle out of a secret location and cruising around the city. She passes what she thinks is a rock sculpture, which then reveals to be a flying robot, who attempts to capture Twain and trap her. She manages to evade being captured by tricking the robot into one of its own traps, and narrowly dodges the explosion. Intercut throughout are scenes of Twain and a band performing in a music video studio setting behind a glass wall. Near the end of the video, she is revealed to be a clone of the actual Twain, who is nearby when she finds the robot's eye and throws it to break the glass. The video ends with the Twain-clone slowly stepping into the outside world. 

In total there are six versions of the "I'm Gonna Getcha Good!" video. The first to be released was the original version for both the 'Red' and 'Green' radio mixes. These were later replaced by an 'SFX Edit' version for both Red and Green versions which featured more sound effects from the motorcycle and robot. The 'Blue' mix was released solely in India, and an alternative 'Red' version was released featuring only Twain and her band performing in the studio setting to the longer album version, unlike the original video which is shortened to suit the radio edit.

The video was a success, peaking at number one on VH1's weekly countdown. The video won the Best Video of the Year Award at the 2003 Canadian Country Music Awards, and Concept Video of the Year at the 2003 CMT Flameworthy Awards. The 'Red SFX Edit' version of the video is available on the DVD-Audio version of Up!, while the 'Green' version is available on Twain's budget video compilation A Collection of Video Hits. After the video shoot, Shania donated the "I'm Gonna Getcha Good!" costume to the Shania Twain Centre in her hometown of Timmins, Ontario.

Chart performance
"I'm Gonna Getcha Good!" debuted on the Billboard Hot Country Singles & Tracks chart the week of October 19, 2002, at number 24, setting what was then a record for the highest-ever debut by a female artist on the country charts (it would later be surpassed by Gretchen Wilson's "All Jacked Up" and later Carrie Underwood's "So Small"). The single spent 20 weeks on the chart and climbed to a peak position of number seven on December 7, 2002, where it remained for one week. "I'm Gonna Getcha Good!" became Twain's 13th top ten single and 17th top 20 single. The song reached number 31 on the Billboard Hot 100 Airplay chart.

At adult contemporary radio, "I'm Gonna Getcha Good!" debuted at number 27 the week of November 16, 2002, the highest debut of the week. The single spent 26 weeks on the chart and climbed to a peak position of number ten on December 21, 2002, where it remained for three non-consecutive weeks. "I'm Gonna Getcha Good!" became Twain's fifth top-ten single and sixth consecutive top 20 single.

"I'm Gonna Getcha Good!" became Twain's third-biggest single in the UK, only behind "That Don't Impress Me Much" and "Man! I Feel Like a Woman!". It also became her fifth consecutive, sixth overall, top-ten single. It debuted on November 16, 2002, at its peak at number four. The song remained on the entire chart for 15 weeks, and has gone on to sell more than 155,000 copies within the nation.

In Canada, the commercial single became Twain's second number one on the Canadian Singles Chart. The song also gained enough airplay in Romania to hit the number one spot. In all, the song hit the top ten in 14 countries: Canada, Denmark, Hungary, Ireland, Latvia, New Zealand, Norway, Poland, Portugal, Romania, Spain, Sweden, Switzerland, and the UK.

Track listings

 Canadian and European CD single
 "I'm Gonna Getcha Good!" (red)
 "C'est la vie" (red)

 UK and Australian CD1
 "I'm Gonna Getcha Good!" (red) – 4:29
 "In My Car (I'll Be the Driver)" (red) – 3:17
 "In My Car (I'll Be the Driver)" (blue) – 3:11

 UK CD2
 "I'm Gonna Getcha Good!" (red) – 4:29
 "C'est la vie" (red) – 3:42
 "C'est la vie" (blue) – 3:36

 UK cassette single
 "I'm Gonna Getcha Good!" (red) – 4:29
 "In My Car (I'll Be the Driver)" (blue) – 3:11

 Australian CD2
 "I'm Gonna Getcha Good!" (green)
 "C'est la vie" (red)
 "C'est la vie" (blue)

 Japanese CD single
 "I'm Gonna Getcha Good!" (red)
 "C'est la vie" (blue)
 "In My Car" (red)
 "In My Car" (blue)

Charts

Weekly charts

Year-end charts

Certifications 

|+Certifications for "I'm Gonna Getcha Good!"

Release history

See also
 List of Romanian Top 100 number ones of the 2000s

References

2002 singles
2002 songs
Canadian Country Music Association Video of the Year videos
Canadian Singles Chart number-one singles
Mercury Records singles
Mercury Nashville singles
Music videos directed by Paul Boyd
Number-one singles in Romania
Shania Twain songs
Song recordings produced by Robert John "Mutt" Lange
Songs written by Robert John "Mutt" Lange
Songs written by Shania Twain